Caffrocrambus leucofascialis is a moth in the family Crambidae. It was described by Anthonie Johannes Theodorus Janse in 1922. It is found in South Africa, where it has been recorded from Gauteng.

References

Endemic moths of South Africa
Crambinae
Moths described in 1922
Moths of Africa